Barbara "Babe" Cushing Mortimer Paley (July 5, 1915 – July 6, 1978) was an American socialite whose second husband William S. Paley was the founder of CBS. Known by the nickname "Babe" for most of her life, she was named to the International Best Dressed List Hall of Fame in 1958.

Early life 
Born Barbara Cushing in Boston, Massachusetts, she was the daughter of brain surgeon Harvey Cushing, professor of surgery at Johns Hopkins, Harvard and Yale, and Katharine Stone (née Crowell). Barbara grew up in Brookline, Massachusetts. Her older sisters Mary and Betsey both married into wealthy families: Mary Cushing was the second wife of Vincent Astor, and Betsey Cushing married James Roosevelt, the son of President Franklin D. Roosevelt, and then later John Hay Whitney. Together, they were known by the public as by the media as the "fabulous Cushing sisters."

As a student at the Westover School in Middlebury, Connecticut, Paley was presented as a debutante in October 1934 in Boston, with Roosevelt's sons in attendance. Her debut drew attention during the Great Depression and marked the beginning of her social career. She graduated from Winsor School in Boston in 1934.

Career
In 1938, Paley began working as a fashion editor for Vogue in New York City. This position gave her access to designer clothes, often given in exchange for Paley's high-profile image. In 1941, Time magazine voted her the world's second-best dressed woman after Wallis Simpson and before Aimée de Heeren. She was also named to the best-dressed lists of 1945 and 1946.

Upon her second marriage in 1947, Paley left her job at Vogue.

Style
Babe and William Paley had an apartment at the St. Regis. Billy Baldwin was hired to do the interior design. The couple lived there during the week and spent their weekends  at the  Kiluna Farm in Manhasset, Long Island, where a succession of landscape architects and garden designers beautified the grounds. The more distant retreat, Kiluna North, on Squam Lake in New Hampshire, was purchased in 1957; there they entertained celebrities who welcomed the privacy.

Though the antisemitic prejudices of society excluded the Paleys from a number of important social functions and exclusive clubs, the Paleys nevertheless kept a circle of high-society friends that included author Truman Capote and fellow socialite Slim Keith. Capote included Paley and Keith in his group of "swans" (a group of New York socialites) along with Gloria Guinness, Marella Agnelli, and C.Z. Guest. Paley famously dropped Capote as a friend when he published excerpts of his much-touted work in progress, Answered Prayers, a tell-all of New York's elite.

In addition to entertaining, Paley maintained her position on the best-dressed list fourteen times before being inducted into the Fashion Hall of Fame in 1958. She regularly bought entire haute couture collections from famed fashion houses like Givenchy and Valentino SpA. Her style influenced many women, but as Bill Blass once observed, "I never saw her not grab anyone's attention, the hair, the makeup, the crispness. You were never conscious of what she was wearing; you noticed Babe and nothing else."

Her personal, unconventional style was enormously influential. A photograph of Paley with a scarf tied to her handbag, for example, created a trendy tidal wave that millions of women emulated. She often mixed extravagant jewelry by Fulco di Verdura and Jean Schlumberger with costume pieces and embraced letting her hair go gray instead of using dye.

Personal life
While working at Vogue, she met and married oil heir Stanley Grafton Mortimer Jr. (1913–1999), the brother of Katharine Mortimer and both of an old and prominent New York family, at St. Luke's Episcopal Church in East Hampton, New York, in 1940. Before their marriage ended by 1946, she and Mortimer had two children:

 Stanley Grafton Mortimer III (born 1942), a Harvard graduate who married Siri Larsen in 1971.
 Amanda Jay Mortimer (born 1944), who married Carter Burden Jr., a Vanderbilt descendant, in 1964; the two divorced in 1972.

Several retrospectives have claimed that Babe neglected her children while in pursuit of social status and depended upon the wealth of her husbands to support her lavish lifestyle. Her daughter Amanda has admitted that their relationship was "virtually nonexistent" and that the distance "was her choice, not mine".

After her divorce from Mortimer, she received a settlement based on a trust fund. In 1946, she met William "Pasha" Paley (1901–1990), who was estranged from his wife Dorothy Hart Hearst (1908–1998), herself the former wife of John Randolph Hearst. Paley was wealthy, with an interest in the arts and a desire to be a part of New York's café society. With Babe's social connections, Paley stood a greater chance of being granted entrée into a society which, until that time, had effectively shut him out. For Babe, Paley offered wealth, security, and worldliness. Following Paley's divorce on July 24, 1947, Babe and Paley were married the following year. Together, Babe and Bill had two additional children:

 William C. "Bill" Paley (born 1948), who relaunched La Palina, a cigar company originated by grandfather Sam Paley in 1896. He married Alison Van Metre, daughter of Albert Van Metre, founder of Van Metre Homes.
 Kate Cushing Paley (born 1950), who made her "nondebut" in 1968, shortly after the assassination of Robert F. Kennedy.

By many biographers' accounts, Paley was lonely and frustrated as William Paley carried on a chain of extramarital affairs. This psychological battering took its toll on her and her family. She was also under public and media scrutiny, and seemingly expected to maintain an unrealistic standard of beauty and social grace.

Final years and death
A heavy smoker, Paley was diagnosed with lung cancer in 1974. In preparation for her impending death, she planned her own funeral, including the food and wine selections that would be served at the funeral luncheon. She allocated her jewelry collection and personal belongings to friends and family, wrapped them in colorful paper, and created a complete file system with directions as to how they would be distributed after her death.

Paley died of lung cancer on July 6, 1978, a day after her 63rd birthday. She was buried in the Memorial Cemetery of St. John's Church, Cold Spring Harbor, New York. On his death in 1990, Bill Paley was buried next to her.

Legacy 
Long after her death, Paley remains iconic in the world of fashion and style. "Babe Paley had only one fault," commented her one-time friend Truman Capote. "She was perfect. Otherwise, she was perfect."

Many fashion designers and interior decorators continue to reference Paley's style in their own creations.

In popular culture
Babe Paley has been portrayed in various films and series, including:
 Life of the Party: The Pamela Harriman Story (1998) by Joan Severance
 Capote (2005) by Michelle Harrison
 Infamous (2006) by Sigourney Weaver
 The Capote Tapes (2019) documentary 
 Halston (2021) by Regina Schneider in episode 1

The 1969 Jacqueline Susann novel The Love Machine includes the characters Judith and Gregory Austin, a socialite and television network CEO, purportedly based on Babe and William Paley. Dyan Cannon portrayed Judith in the 1971 film adaptation.

The 2016 Melanie Benjamin novel The Swans of Fifth Avenue depicts Paley alongside Truman Capote and Slim Keith.

References

Further reading
Smith, Sally Bedell (1948- ). In all his glory: the life and times of William S. Paley and the birth of modern broadcasting. New York, Simon and Schuster, 1990.
Grafton, David. The Sisters: Babe Mortimer Paley, Betsey Roosevelt Whitney, Minnie Astor Fosburgh - The Lives and Times of the Fabulous Cushing Sisters. Villard (1992).
Tapert, Annette & Edkins, Diana, The Power of Style - The Women Who Defined The Art of Living Well, Crown Publishers, New York, 1994.
Prisant, Carol. Babe & I. Town & Country, December, 2010, pp. 152–156.

External links

 Domino magazine's "Editor's Pick - Babe Paley, featuring a photo of Paley at her Round Hill Villa in Jamaica
 Fashion designer Zang Toi's Spring 2005 collection inspired by Babe Paley's time in Jamaica
 NewYorkSocialDiary.com
 

1915 births
1978 deaths
20th-century American women writers
20th-century American writers
American magazine editors
American socialites
Mortimer family of New York
Burials in New York (state)
American fashion journalists
Deaths from lung cancer in New York (state)
People from Boston
Vogue (magazine) people
American women journalists
People from Manhasset, New York
Women magazine editors
Winsor School alumni
Cushing family